"Bravo Bravo" (stylized as "Bravo☆Bravo") is the title of the ninth single by Hello! Project unit Buono!. The title song is the first song used for the ending theme of the anime Shugo Chara Party!, and the ninth of the entire series. The single was released on December 16, 2009, in Japan under the Pony Canyon label in two different versions: regular and limited. The limited edition came with a serial number card, used in a promotional draw, a special DVD and a Buono! trading card, as well as having an alternative cover. The DVD contains footage of the "making of" the jacket photography for the single. The first press of both editions came with a photocard. The Single V was released on December 22, 2009. The single peaked at #4 on the weekly Oricon charts, selling 18,086 copies in its first week.

To commemorate the group's first live tour, copies of the CD were sold during their performance at Tokyo Kōsei Nenkin Kaikan, and all buyers were entered into a lottery to win an autographed poster, presented to them by the girls.

Track listing

CD

Limited Edition DVD

References

External links 
 "Bravo Bravo" entries on the Hello! Project official website: CD 

2009 singles
Shugo Chara!
Buono! songs
Song recordings produced by Tsunku
Songs written by Tsunku
2009 songs
Pony Canyon singles